Emma Uren (born 1 October 1997) is an English rugby union player.

Born in Chiswick and brought up in Twickenham, she first played for Richmond Borough, winning the London Youth Games aged 11. At Orleans Park School, she played rugby league before taking up union at 16 for Grasshoppers RFC in Isleworth.  Uren was further educated at St Mary’s University, Twickenham, studying Strength and Conditioning Sciences. She split her final year of studies into two to take up a contract with the England women's national rugby sevens team. She captained England U20s to their first ever victory against France in France in March 2018 and played a number of Tyrrells Premier 15s games for season champions Saracens Ladies.

In June 2021 she was confirmed in the Great Britain Rugby Sevens squad for the delayed 2020 Summer Games in Tokyo. She was named in the England squad for the 2022 Rugby World Cup Sevens – Women's tournament held in Cape Town, South Africa in September 2022.

References

1997 births
Living people
Olympic rugby sevens players of Great Britain
Rugby sevens players at the 2020 Summer Olympics
Rugby union players from Chiswick
English female rugby union players
England international women's rugby sevens players